Lucy Paige Cripps (born 6 December 2001) is an Australian cricketer who plays for Victoria in the Women's National Cricket League (WNCL) and the Melbourne Stars in the Women's Big Bash League (WBBL). An all-rounder, she bats right-handed and bowls right-arm medium pace. She played in one match for the Stars in the 2020–21 WBBL season and three matches for Victoria in the 2020–21 WNCL season.

References

External links

Lucy Cripps at Cricket Australia

2001 births
Living people
Cricketers from Melbourne
Sportswomen from Victoria (Australia)
Australian women cricketers
Melbourne Stars (WBBL) cricketers
Victoria women cricketers
People from Frankston, Victoria